The Philippine television mystery music game show I Can See Your Voice premiered the inaugural first season on ABS-CBN on September 16, 2017. This season has originally scheduled to air for 13 weeks; but it was then further extended to 15 months that aired 128 episodes, making it the longest in ICSYV franchise by episode count.

Gameplay

Format
Under the original format, the guest artist can eliminate one or two mystery singers after each round. The game concludes with the last mystery singer standing which depends on the outcome of a duet performance with a guest artist.

Rewards
If singer is good, the guest artist wins an award (as Eyeward) and he/she will compete at Tawag ng Tanghalan. The winning singer, regardless of being good (SEE-nger) or bad (SEE-ntunado), wins .

Rounds
Each episode presents the guest artist with six people whose identities and singing voices are kept concealed until they are eliminated to perform on the "stage of truth" or remain in the end to perform the final duet.

Episodes

Summary

Gary Valenciano is the only guest artist to both played in premiere and finale episodes. In a rare occurrence, an entire cast (host Luis Manzano and SING-vestigators Wacky Kiray, Kean Cipriano, Alex Gonzaga, Andrew E., Angeline Quinto, and Bayani Agbayani) have been played on episodes for their respective "birthdays".

Also in that season, the show did celebrate its first anniversary (dubbed as Unang Laugh-Laugh-fun) by airing a special episode, with Daniel Padilla playing on entire Kalokalike alumni.

Best Mode (September 9, 2018)
As a prelude to the series' first anniversary, this episode includes behind the scenes and unaired happenings, as well as rankings on mystery singers' performances for the past 98 episodes, which is almost similar to Postseason Showcases in the original South Korean counterpart.

Reception

Television ratings

Source: Kantar Media Philippines

References 

I Can See Your Voice (Philippine game show)
2017 Philippine television seasons
2018 Philippine television seasons
2019 Philippine television seasons